4  (Four) is the first release by the Greek alternative rock band Matisse. The EP was released in the summer of 2003 and it includes the song "The Great Sleep", which is considered a fan favorite in their live shows.

Track listening

References

Matisse (band) albums
2003 EPs